Little Para was a single-member electoral district for the South Australian House of Assembly in the north of the Adelaide metropolitan area, covering the suburbs of Elizabeth, Elizabeth Grove, Elizabeth North, Elizabeth East, Elizabeth Park, Elizabeth South, Elizabeth Vale, Gould Creek, Hillbank, Salisbury Heights and Salisbury Park, and parts of Craigmore, Golden Grove and Greenwith.

The river was discovered by B. T. Finniss in 1837. "Para" is an Aboriginal term for 'stream of water'.

Renamed from Elizabeth at the 2006 state election, the electorate was originally drawn around the City of Elizabeth (now part of the City of Playford). The 1998 and 2002 redistributions made considerable changes, moving the focus further east.

Little Para was mostly working class, with some middle class suburbs on its eastern edges. All but the western end on the plains was in the foothills of the Adelaide Hills.

Little Para was abolished by a name change back to Elizabeth for the 2018 state election when the Little Para River became the southern boundary of the redrawn Electorate which now extended further north and  the majority of the eastern portion of Little Para moved into the newly created  King.

Members for Little Para

Election results

Notes

References
 ABC profile for Little Para: 2014
 ECSA profile for Little Para: 2014
 Poll Bludger profile for Little Para: 2014

2006 establishments in Australia
2018 disestablishments in Australia
Former electoral districts of South Australia
Constituencies established in 2006
Constituencies disestablished in 2018